Strike a Pose is a Belgian-Dutch documentary film, which premiered in the Panorama section of the 2016 Berlinale. Directed by Ester Gould and Reijer Zwaan, the film profiles the dancers who performed with Madonna on her Blond Ambition World Tour in 1990.

Story 
The film follows the dancers during the 25 years since the tour. Some went on to act in film, TV and stage, and all of them kept dance in their lives. Some had to deal with AIDS, drug use and homelessness. The six who appear in the film are Kevin Stea, Carlton Wilborn, Luis Xtravaganza Camacho, Jose Gutierez Xtravaganza, Salim Gauwloos and Oliver S Crumes III. One of the original seven, Gabriel Trupin, died from complications due to AIDS in 1995 and is represented in the film by his mother, Sue Trupin.

Production 
The film was partially financed by the International Documentary Film Festival Forum Award, Amsterdam, and was produced by CTM Docs and The Other Room in coproduction with Serendipity Films and NTR. The film premiered at the 2016 Berlin International Film Festival where it received the second place Panorama audience award for a documentary.

Awards and nominations 
 Best LGBT Film - Key West Film Festival
 Best Queer Film of the Year 2016 - Merlinka festival
 Nominated for Golden Athena - Athens International Film Festival
 Nominated for Audience Award - Hot Docs Canadian International Documentary Festival
 Nominated for Audience Award - Berlin International Film Festival

References

External links
 Official website
 

2016 documentary films
2016 LGBT-related films
2016 films
2010s English-language films
Belgian documentary films
Belgian LGBT-related films
Documentary films about dance
Documentary films about LGBT topics
Dutch documentary films
Dutch LGBT-related films
Cultural depictions of Madonna